This is a list of the 7 districts of Kosovo by Human Development Index as of 2023 with data for the year 2021.

References 

Kosovo
Kosovo

Economy of Kosovo